E. arboreae may refer to:
 Eisenia arborea, the southern sea palm, a kelp species found from Vancouver Island, Canada to Isla Magdalena, Mexico
 Erica arborea, the tree heath, a flowering plant species native to the maquis shrublands surrounding the Mediterranean Basin

See also 
 Arborea (disambiguation)